Tomislav Šorša (born 11 May 1989) is a Croatian football midfielder, currently playing for FC Brașov in the Romanian Liga II.

Club career
Šorša started his career playing at youth level for his hometown club Osijek, with whom he signed a professional four-year contract in July 2006. He made his debut for the first team in the 2006–07 season and made a total of thirteen appearances before being loaned to Druga HNL side Karlovac for the 2008–09 season. He helped them win the promotion to Prva HNL with two goals in 25 appearances. In September 2009, Šorša extended his contract for four more years. The following season Šorša scored his first goal in Prva HNL in a 3–1 victory over Istra 1961. He began his career as a striker, but manager Tomislav Steinbrückner moved him into a midfield role during the course of the season. In season 2016/17 he was loaned to Romanian club CFR Cluj, but returned to Osijek on 9 July 2017.

Career statistics

References

External links
 

Tomislav Šorša at Sportnet.hr 

1989 births
Living people
Sportspeople from Osijek
Croatian people of Hungarian descent
Association football midfielders
Croatian footballers
Croatia youth international footballers
NK Osijek players
NK Karlovac players
CFR Cluj players
SC Gjilani players
FC Brașov (2021) players
Croatian Football League players
First Football League (Croatia) players
Liga I players
Liga II players
Croatian expatriate footballers
Expatriate footballers in Romania
Croatian expatriate sportspeople in Romania
Expatriate footballers in Kosovo
Croatian expatriate sportspeople in Kosovo